The rhythm dance (RD) is the first segment of an ice dance competition. The International Skating Union (ISU) renamed the short dance to the "rhythm dance" in June 2018, prior to the 2018–2019 season.  It became part of international competitions in July 2018. French ice dancers Gabriella Papadakis and Guillaume Cizeron hold the highest RD score of 90.83 points, which they achieved at the 2022 Beijing Winter Olympics.

Background 

The rhythm dance (RD) is the first segment performed in all junior and senior ice dance competitions, performed before the free dance (FD), at all International Skating Union (ISU) Championships, Junior and Senior ISU Grand Prix events and finals, Winter Youth Olympic Games, qualifying competitions for the Winter Olympic Games, and Olympic Winter Games. The ISU defines the RD as "a dance created by an Ice Dance Couple to dance music with designated rhythm(s) and/or theme(s)" selected and announced by the ISU yearly. In 2010, the ISU voted to eliminate the compulsory dance (CD) and the original dance (OD) and change the structure of ice dance competitions to include the short dance (SD) and free dance (FD). In the 2018–19 season, the short dance (SD) came to be known as the rhythm dance (RD) because according to the ISU, the new term "is better aligned with what the competition is all about". The structure and rules for the RD, however, remained essentially the same.

For both junior and senior dance teams, the duration of the RD is "2 minutes and 50 seconds (unless otherwise decided by the Ice Dance Technical Committee and announced in an ISU Communication)". The RD includes what the ISU calls a "pattern dance element," which it defines as a "series of prescribed steps, turns and movements in a Rhythm Dance" consisting of a sequence and/or section of a pattern dance and a combination of steps or turns from a pattern dance.

The RD must include a set pattern dance, which the ISU defines as "the design of the dance on the ice". The ISU chooses the pattern dance yearly, from a list of predetermined dances. Pattern dance diagrams, published by the ISU, include everything ice dancers need to know to perform one complete pattern, called a sequence, of the dance. Ice dancers can choose to perform the set pattern dance, following as closely as possible the direction, location, and curvature of all edges as designated in the diagram. They can also perform the optional pattern dance, which can be altered as long as the dancers maintain the original dance's step sequences, timing, and positions, and if each repetition is performed in the same way and is restarted from the same place as the first repetition.

During the pattern dance, the judges look for the dancers' skating skills, presentation, and timing. Skating skills is defined by the ISU as "the ability of the Couple to precisely execute perform dance steps and movements in accordance with the dance description with power, balance, depth of edges, easy transition from one foot or lobe to the other, glide and flow". Skating skills must have the following criteria: overall skating quality; power and speed; clarity of edges, steps, turns, movements; balance and glide; flow; and ice coverage. Presentation is defined as "the display of the correct rhythm or style as required by the description of the dance or by the specific style of the dance"; partners must demonstrate expressiveness, as welll as projection and unison and awareness of space. Timing is defined as "the ability of the Couple to skate strictly in time with the music". Partners must demonstrate the following criteria in regards to their timing during the pattern dance: musical sensitivity, skating in time with the music, and skating on the strong beat. They must also start their first step of their pattern dance on the first beat.

The RD should be "developed through skating skill and quality", rather than through "non-skating actions such as sliding on one knee" or through the use of toe steps (which should only be used to reflect the music's nuances and underlining rhythm, and the dance's character). RDs should be choreographed to reach all sides of the ice rink, and not be focused only on the judges' section. Touching the ice with the hands is not allowed, unless otherwise specified and announced by the ISU; sliding or kneeling on two knees, or sitting on the ice, are also not allowed as these are considered by the judges to be a fall, unless otherwise specified/announced.

The music chosen by the ice dance teams for the RD, which can include vocals, must be "suitable for Ice Dance as a sport discipline" and must reflect the character of the music and/or selected dance rhythms and/or themes. The RD must fit the phrasing of the music ice dance teams use. It must "be translated to the ice by demonstrating technical skill with steps and movements along with flow and the use of edges". Ice dance teams can choose music with "an audible rhythmic beat," although the music can be, at the start of the program, "without an audible rhythmic beat" for up to 10 seconds.

There are no restrictions on dance holds, or any variation of dance holds, during the RD. Ice dance teams lose points (one point per program) if they stop in one place for more than ten seconds at the beginning and/or at the end of their programs. They are allowed a full stop of up to ten seconds, or two full stops of up to five seconds each, during the course of the program. A dance spin or choreographic spinning movement that does not travel is considered a stop. Ice dance teams should not separate, except when necessary for performing any required element or to change a hold, and they can only be separated by up to two arms' lengths during that time. Separations that occur at the beginning and/or end of the program can only last up to 10 seconds and there are no restrictions on the distance of the separation at that time. All changes of position, dance steps, rotations, and turns are allowed, as long as they follow the music and the designated rhythms. The two skaters can fully extend their arms while skating in a hand-to-hand hold only if it reflects the character of their chosen music rhythm, but this method of separation must not be excessively used. Both partners must perform "difficult, original, varied and intricate footwork" during the RD.

As of the 2019–20 season, female ice dancers were allowed to wear trousers; men were required to wear full-length trousers. The costumes worn by ice dance teams, while reflecting the character of their chosen music, could not be "garish or theatrical in design", and had to be "modest, dignified, not give the effect of excessive nudity and appropriate for athletic competition". Ice dance teams could not use props and accessories during the RD.

French ice dancers Gabriella Papadakis and Guillaume Cizeron hold the highest RD score of 92.73, which they achieved at the 2022 World Championships. They also hold the seven highest RD scores.

Requirements 

The required elements for the RD are announced by the ISU yearly. The required elements in the RD for both junior and senior skaters are: dance lift(s), dance spin(s), turn sequence(s), and step sequence(s). The following movements are not allowed in the RD: touching the ice with the hand or hands, unless otherwise specified by the ISU; and kneeling or sliding on two knees or sitting on the ice, both of which will be considered as a fall by judges, also unless otherwise specified by the ISU. As of the 2022-2023 season, senior ice dancers no longer had to perform a pattern dance in the RDs, but instead were required to execute a choreographic rhythm sequence, which was evaluated as a choreographic element by the judges.

2022–2023 season 
In April 2022, the ISU published the requirements for the 2022–2023 season. The ISU adds, "To comply with the ethical values of sports, any music chosen for Ice Dance competitions must not include aggressive and/or offending lyrics".

Junior ice dance teams had to select the tango plus at least one of the following dance styles: the bolero, the fandango, the flamenco, the jota, the Milonga, the paso doble, the Sevillanas, and the Spanish Waltz. They had to execute two sections of the Argentine tango in their pattern dance element, skated to a tango rhythm and/or style, with the range of tempo of 24 measures of four beats per minute, 96 beats per minute, plus or minus two beats per minute. They could skate the two sections of their pattern dance in any order, either one after the other or separately. The first Argentine tango had to make up steps one through 18 and the second one had to make up steps 19 though 31; step number 19 had to be executed at the judges' right side. Variation of holds during the pattern dance was allowed, as was crossing the rink's long axis during steps number 13 through 15.

Senior ice dance teams had to select Latin dance styles, with at least two different dance styles and/or rhythms chosen from the following: the bachata, the cha-cha, the mambo, the merengue, the rhumba, the salsa, and the samba. They were required to execute their pattern dance-type step sequence and step sequence to a different Latin-style and/or rhythm. The RD had to reflect the character of the music they chose, their selected dance rhythms(s), and/or theme(s). The dancers had to translate their RD to the ice "by demonstrating technical skill with a variety of steps, turns,... and movements executed precisely and completely along with balance and glide, flow, power and speed, and unison". They had to deliver their RD in harmony and spacial awareness and their skating had to fit to the phrasing of the music.

During skaters' pattern dance-type step sequence (PSt), they had to skate to a different rhythm and/or style than the rhythm and/or style they close for their step sequence. The duration of their PSt could be "any exact number of musical phrases". The PSt had to start after a stop, which counted as one of the allowed stops, on the short axis from either side of the rink and had to end on the short axis on the opposite side of the rink. One loop in any direction, which could cross the rink's long axis, was permitted within the pattern. The dancers had to remain in contact at all times during the PSt, even during change of holds, except when performing twizzles as part of their connecting choreography. They could perform one set of sequential twizzles. Each partner had to perform at two twizzles, during which they could not be in contact with each other. They were allowed to execute up to one step between twizzles and each push and/or transfer of weight while on two feet between twizzles was considered a step.

Both senior and junior ice dance teams had to perform only one short lift, lasting up to seven seconds. Each partner had to execute two different difficult turns during the RD from the following: the choctaw, the counter, the rocker, and the forward outside mohawk. Stops were not allowed during the RD, except at the beginning to indicate the start of the PSt; if a stop lasting longer than five seconds occurred at the beginning of the PSt, no other stops were allowed during the rest of the RD. Also not allowed were the following: separations, except during twizzles if they were performed as connecting choreography; retrogressions; and hand-in-hand holds executed with fully extended arms. The Choreographic Rhythm Sequence (ChRS), which was evaluated as a choreographic element, could be skated to any of the designated Latin rhythms and/or styles and performed in the dancers' chosen rhythm's style. Their holds could include hand-in-hand holds, with fully-extended arms, with the exception of permitted separation(s). The pattern of their ChRS had to start on either side of the rink's short axis, had to begin ten meters on either side of the short axis, and had to proceed from barrier to barrier (or when at least one of the partners was not more than two meters from each barrier). The following are allowed during the ChRS: Retrogressions, loops, and separations (but not more than two arms-lengths apart and durations not over one measure of music).

Footnotes

References

Works cited
"Communication No. 2468: Ice Dance" (PDF). (ISU No. 2468) Lausanne, Switzerland: International Skating Union. 19 April 2022. Retrieved 16 January 2023.
 "Special Regulations & Technical Rules Single & Pair Skating and Ice Dance 2022". (S&P/ID 2022) Lausanne, Switzerland: International Skating Union. 2022. Retrieved 16 January 2023.

Ice dance